Kenaz Swain (born 16 April 2005) is a Bahamian footballer who plays for Western Warriors and the Bahamas national football team.

Club career
As of 2021 Swain plays for Western Warriors of the BFA Senior League. For the 2018/19 season he was part of the club's under-15 side that went undefeated on the season, culminating with a 3–1 victory over Dynamos FC U15 in the championship match. Swain's defensive performance was specifically noted by local media as a key to the championship victory. That season the team scored sixty nine goals while conceding only one.

International career
Swain represented the Bahamas at the 2019 CONCACAF Under-15 Championship and in 2019 CONCACAF U-17 Championship qualifying. He received his first senior international call-up at age 16 for 2022 FIFA World Cup qualification. He made his debut coming on as a substitute on 2 June 2021 in a 0–7 loss to Puerto Rico days later.

Career statistics

International

References

External links
Bahamas FA profile
Soccerway profile

2005 births
Living people
Bahamian footballers
Bahamas international footballers
Association football forwards
Sportspeople from Nassau, Bahamas